Secrets of Women (also known as Waiting Women) is a 1952 Swedish film directed by Ingmar Bergman. It was screened within the official selection of Venice Film Festival (1953). It is a drama about young relationships told in flashbacks by a group of women.

Since its release, Secrets of Women, while not regarded as one of Bergman's strongest efforts, has nonetheless received positive reviews from film critics.

Plot
While waiting at a table for the arrival of their husbands who happen to be the Lobelius brothers, three women, Rakel, Karin, and Marta, begin talking and share secrets.

Rakel's story

Rakel is married to Eugen, and is having an affair with Kaj. One day, Kaj and Eugen return home from a shooting excursion. Rakel, professing to be disgusted by Kaj, reveals she has cheated on Eugen. Rakel tells Eugen she is not looking for his forgiveness; Eugen says he intends to expel Rakel from the house, with her possessions and an allowance. Rakel replies she is not Eugen's property. Eugen storms out with a rifle, with Rakel chasing after him, fearing he will commit suicide. When Eugen threatens to kill himself, Rakel asks an elderly neighbour to talk sense into him.

In the present, Rakel tells the women at the table she has come to think of Eugen as her child and is resolved to take care of him. Encouraged by Rakel's candor, Marta tells of her own story, her affair with Eugen's brother Martin, a painter.

Marta's story

Marta learns she is pregnant, and after an appointment with a gynecologist, returns home to tell Martin. There, Martin is being visited by his brothers to inform him of their father's death. One of the brothers, Fredrik, the head of the family firm, says he is disturbed by the fact that Martin will not attend their father's funeral, and says Martin will not be given a job at the firm. When the family left, Marta tried to tell Martin of her pregnancy, but he refuses to hear the news she wants to tell him. On a date that night, he discusses his intention to part ways with Marta, and asks what she had wanted to say, but she says she was only joking about having news. They separate without Marta informing him of their expected child, and she gives birth without him.

Back at the table, Marta's sister Maj professes to like the story, but dislikes the fact that Marta and Martin reconciled, which Marta attributes to their love for each other. Karin says her story is not so much a story as a comedic episode, and proceeds to tell her tale.

Karin's story

Karen accompanies her husband Fredrik to receive the crown prince at an event, and doesn't warn Fredrik that he has shaving cream in his ear the entire time. After leaving the event, the couple enter an elevator, which malfunctions and becomes stuck, trapping Fredrik and Karin inside. After the commotion, Karin is amused to see Fredrik's crushed top hat. While waiting, Fredrik asks Karin if she has ever been unfaithful, and Karin casually and quickly replies yes. She then accuses him of having an affair with a woman named Diana, and says her own confession was a lie. Fredrik says he ended the affair with Diana quickly, claiming Diana was a madwoman. Karin then admits that her claim to have cheated was somewhat true, and that she has embellished her story about Diana. They make love in the elevator, then quickly get dressed as the elevator starts moving up to rescuers.

After the women have told their stories, Marta learns Maj is planning to run away with her lover, Henrik, oldest brother Paul and his wife Annette's son who is supposed to arrive with his father and uncles, but who secretly arrived earlier. Marta says she will force Maj not to leave, but Maj replies she is not a child. The men arrive as Henrik and Maj take off on a boat. Paul tells Marta to let them go, since they will return soon enough after gaining wisdom by spending the summer doing "something they think is forbidden."

Cast

Release and reception
In 2018, The Criterion Collection released the film on Blu-ray in Region A, along with 38 other Bergman films, in the set Ingmar Bergman's Cinema.

Secrets of Women holds a 88% approval rating on review aggregator Rotten Tomatoes, based on eight critics.

References

External links
 
 

1952 films
Films directed by Ingmar Bergman
Films with screenplays by Ingmar Bergman
1950s Swedish-language films
1952 comedy films
Swedish black-and-white films
Swedish comedy films
1950s Swedish films